|}
{| class="collapsible collapsed" cellpadding="0" cellspacing="0" style="clear:right; float:right; text-align:center; font-weight:bold;" width="280px"
! colspan="3" style="border:1px solid black; background-color: #77DD77;" | Also Ran

The 2009 Epsom Derby was a horse race which took place at Epsom Downs on Saturday 6 June 2009. It was the 230th running of the Derby, and it was won by Sea the Stars. The winner was ridden by Michael Kinane and trained by John Oxx. The pre-race favourite Fame and Glory finished second.

Race details
 Sponsor: Investec
 Winner's prize money: £709,625
 Going: Good
 Number of runners: 12
 Winner's time: 2m 36.74s

Full result

* The distances between the horses are shown in lengths or shorter – nse = nose; shd = short-head; hd = head; nk = neck† Trainers are based in Great Britain unless indicated

Winner's details
Further details of the winner, Sea the Stars:

 Foaled: 6 April 2006 in Ireland
 Sire: Cape Cross; Dam: Urban Sea (Miswaki)
 Owner: Christopher Tsui
 Breeder: Sunderland Holdings Ltd
 Rating in 2009 World Thoroughbred Rankings: 136

Form analysis

Two-year-old races
Notable runs by the future Derby participants as two-year-olds in 2008.

 Sea the Stars – 1st Beresford Stakes
 Fame and Glory – 1st Critérium de Saint-Cloud
 Masterofthehorse – 3rd Beresford Stakes, 11th Racing Post Trophy
 Rip Van Winkle – 1st Tyros Stakes, 7th Dewhurst Stakes
 Crowded House – 2nd Tattersalls Million, 1st Racing Post Trophy
 Age of Aquarius – 4th Critérium de Saint-Cloud
 Kite Wood – 1st Autumn Stakes
 Gan Amhras – 2nd Goffs (C & G) Million

The road to Epsom
Early-season appearances in 2009 and trial races prior to running in the Derby.

 Sea the Stars – 1st 2,000 Guineas
 Fame and Glory – 1st Ballysax Stakes, 1st Derrinstown Stud Derby Trial
 Masterofthehorse – 2nd Chester Vase
 Rip Van Winkle – 4th 2,000 Guineas
 Golden Sword – 4th Prix Noailles, 1st Chester Vase
 Crowded House – 8th Dante Stakes
 Age of Aquarius – 1st Lingfield Derby Trial
 Debussy – 1st Blue Riband Trial Stakes, 3rd Chester Vase
 Kite Wood – 5th Dante Stakes
 Black Bear Island – 3rd Prix La Force, 1st Dante Stakes
 Gan Amhras – 3rd 2,000 Guineas
 Montaff – 2nd Lingfield Derby Trial

Subsequent Group 1 wins
Group 1 / Grade I victories after running in the Derby.

 Sea the Stars – Eclipse Stakes (2009), International Stakes (2009), Irish Champion Stakes (2009), Prix de l'Arc de Triomphe (2009)
 Fame and Glory – Irish Derby (2009), Tattersalls Gold Cup (2010), Coronation Cup (2010), Ascot Gold Cup (2011)
 Rip Van Winkle – Sussex Stakes (2009), Queen Elizabeth II Stakes (2009), International Stakes (2010)
 Debussy – Arlington Million (2010)

Subsequent breeding careers
Leading progeny of participants in the 2009 Epsom Derby.

Sires of Classic winners
Sea The Stars (1st) Sire of fourteen individual Group/Grade One winners including six classic winners as of August 2020
 Taghrooda - 1st Epsom Oaks (2014)
 Sea The Moon - 1st Deutsches Derby (2014)
 Harzand - 1st Epsom Derby, 1st Irish Derby (2016)
 Sea Of Class - 1st Irish Oaks (2018)
 Star Catcher - 1st Irish Oaks (2019)
 Stradivarius - Champion Stayer (2018, 2019)

Sires of Group/Grade One winners
Rip Van Winkle (4th) - Later exported to New Zealand
 Dick Whittington - 1st Phoenix Stakes (2014)
 Te Akau Shark - 1st Chipping Norton Stakes (2020)
 Jennifer Eccles - 1st New Zealand Oaks (2020)
 Winston C - 1st New York Turf Writers Cup (2019)

Sires of National Hunt horses
Fame And Glory (2nd)
 Gardons Le Sourire - 1st Prix Ferdinand Dufaure (2020), 1st Prix Jean Stern (2020)
 Commander Of Fleet - 2nd Spa Novices' Hurdle (2019)
 Embittered - 3rd County Handicap Hurdle (2020)

Other Stallions
Masterofthehorse (3rd) - Flat and jumps winnersGolden Sword (5th) - Exported to South AfricaCrowded House (6th) - Exported to Australia

References
 
 Epsom 15:45 – Result: Investec Derby Sporting Life

Epsom Derby
 2009
Epsom Derby
Epsom Derby
2000s in Surrey